Cassie Pappas is an American television writer, screenwriter and playwright. She has worked on the FX drama series Tyrant and the Showtime series The L Word. She is currently writing MGM's remake of the 1980s cult classic Road House starring Ronda Rousey. She is also developing a limited drama series for Amazon produced by Jill Soloway (Transparent). Set in 1942 during World War II, the period drama tells the story of the women in Texas who formed the first All Girl Rodeo.

Early life 
Pappas played basketball at Mater Dei High School where they won two state championships. Pappas went on to play at Butler University in Indianapolis, IN before transferring to The University of Texas where she studied playwriting.

Career 
Some of Pappas' earlier writing credits include the CBS drama Hostages and the MTV comedy Awkward. In 2011, she wrote Dreamhouse a single-camera comedy for Fox with 3 Arts Entertainment producing. The following year she penned 20s vs 30s, a semi-autobiographical comedy based on her relationship with her sister for ABC.

Pappas wrote and performed in the Off-Broadway production of Pieces (of Ass) at the New World Stages in New York and Raleigh Studios in Los Angeles. She also wrote and directed the play Colin Grey at The Kennedy Center American Theatre Festival.

References

External links

American screenwriters
American dramatists and playwrights
Living people
Year of birth missing (living people)
Butler University alumni
University of Texas alumni